Gynnidomorpha pista is a species of moth of the family Tortricidae. It is found in China (Anhui, Beijing, Fujian, Guangxi, Guizhou, Hainan, Hong Kong, Liaoning, Tianjin).

The wingspan is 10−14 mm.

References

Moths described in 1984
Cochylini